Liolaemus uniformis is a species of lizard in the family Iguanidae or the family Liolaemidae. The species is endemic to Chile.

References

uniformis
Lizards of South America
Reptiles of Chile
Endemic fauna of Chile
Reptiles described in 2016
Taxa named by Jaime Troncoso-Palacios